Fred Haeseker was the film critic and entertainment writer at the Calgary Herald from 1979 until 1999.  During this time he wrote hundreds or reviews on current releases as well as news about the local filmmaking scene in Calgary; including articles on the first efforts of director David Winning.  Haeseker's reviews were included in the essay Canada's Best Features: Critical Essays on 15 Canadian Films By Eugene P. Walz.

References

External links
 Artistic and Truly Canadian, written by Fred Haeseker, Calgary Herald, March 26, 1980
 Look Out World, It's a Brady Bunch Movie, written by Fred Haeseker, Calgary Herald, February 16, 1995
 Leon the Pig Farmer finds His Dream, written by Fred Haeseker, Calgary Herald, February 11, 1994

Living people
Year of birth missing (living people)
Canadian film critics